Charles Currie, S.J., (1930 – January 4, 2019) was an American Jesuit and academic administrator. He served as the president of Wheeling Jesuit University and Xavier University. He was also the chair of the Association of Jesuit Colleges and Universities from 1997 to 2011.

References

1930 births
2019 deaths
Presidents of Xavier University
Presidents of Wheeling University
Fordham University alumni
Boston College alumni
Catholic University of America alumni
People from Philadelphia